Astral Canticle is a double concerto for violin, flute, and orchestra by the American composer Augusta Read Thomas. The work was Thomas's sixth and final commission by the Chicago Symphony Orchestra before she concluded her nine-year tenure there as composer-in-residence.  It was first performed in Chicago on June 1, 2006, by the flutist Mathieu Dufour, the violinist Robert Chen, and the Chicago Symphony Orchestra under the conductor Daniel Barenboim.  The piece is dedicated to Barenboim and the Chicago Symphony Orchestra.  The composition was a finalist for the 2007 Pulitzer Prize for Music.

Composition
Astral Canticle has a duration of roughly 20 minutes and is composed in one continuous movement.  Thomas described elements of the work in the score program notes, writing, "The title is derived from Astral — connected with the stars; and Canticle — denoting a song or chant."  She continued:

Instrumentation
The work is scored for solo violin, solo flute, and an orchestra comprising piccolo, two additional flutes, three oboes, three clarinets, two bassoons (doubling contrabassoon), four horns, three trumpets, three trombones, tuba, three percussionists, harp, and strings.

Reception
Reviewing the world premiere, John von Rhein of the Chicago Tribune called the strength of the piece "undeniable in this first performance."  He wrote:
Rhein added, "There's no doubt Astral Canticle will make its way through the orchestral world."

References

Compositions by Augusta Read Thomas
2005 compositions
Concertos for multiple instruments
Music commissioned by the Chicago Symphony Orchestra